is one of the 100 Famous Japanese Mountains, reaching the height of . It is situated in Japan's Hida Mountains in Gifu Prefecture and Toyama Prefecture. It was specified for Chūbu-Sangaku National Park on December 4, 1934.

Outline 
The origin of the mountain name is the meaning that the stone rolls. It is said "gōro" in Japanese. Also this mountain is located in the source part of the Kurobe River. Then it is called "Kurobe-Gorō".
In the hillside on the east side, there is big Cirque geographical features that is the hollow where the shovel was scooped out.
The upper part of this mountain is situated in Tree line region, Siberian Dwarf Pine and Alpine plant grow naturally. There are quite a lot of kinds of alpine plant in the surrounding, and it is selected to "the 100 famous Japanese mountains of flower" by Sumie Tanaka.

Mountaineering 
In December 1931, Buntarō Katō of Japanese mountain climbers had climbed it alone.

Main ascent routes 
There are several climbing routes to the top of the mountain.
 Hietsu-shin-dō
 Kamioka-shin-dō
 Arimine-guchi
 The west Ginza diamond course (from Oritate – Mount Kurobegorō – to Mount Yari)
There are the Ridge Line and Cirque routes from the Kurobegorō hut to the top.

Mountain hut 
Thera are several mountain huts around Mount Kurobegorō.
  – in the col between Mount Kurobegorō and Mount Mitsumatarenge (with Campsite)
  – in the col between Mount Yakushi and Mount Tarō (with Campsite)
  – in the col between Mount Mitsumatagenge and Mount Washiba (with Campsite)

Alpine plant 
A lot of Alpine plant are seen in the surrounding.

Geography

Nearby mountains

Rivers 
The mountain is the source of the following rivers, each of which flows to the Sea of Japan.
 Nakanomata River (tributary of the Takahara River)
 Kanekido River (tributary of the Jōganji River)
 Uma River and Gorō River (tributaries of the Kurobe River)

Scenery of Mount Kurobegorō

References

See also

 Hida Mountains
 Chūbu-Sangaku National Park
 List of mountains in Japan
 100 Famous Japanese Mountains

Hida Mountains
Japan Alps
Mountains of Gifu Prefecture
Mountains of Toyama Prefecture